Football is one of the most popular sports in Jamaica. It introduced to the country by the British colonialists by the end of the 19th century and quickly took hold.

Early History
In 1893, the Kingston Cricket Club, which was founded in 1863 by the elite of the colonial society, founded the first football team. 
Two years later, nationwide newspapers report about women's football for the first time.

Between 1925 and 1932, a Jamaican men's national team was formed and played a number of friendlies, mostly against neighbors Haiti. These matches were usually played at Sabina Park, the main cricket ground of the island. In the following years, female football clubs started to form in Kingston, playing a first match in the same stadium in November 1935 to raise funds for charities. In the coming years, women's football started to outgrow men's football on the island and reached the cities of Spanish Town, Montego Bay, Port Antonio and Saint Ann's Bay, attracting more fans than the men did and igniting public debates about the need for a nationwide league for women. Starting from the 1940s, there is no further reporting on women's football, suggesting that Jamaica Football Federation might have followed the English FA and officially banned the sport for women.
It is unknown if men played football at that time on the island, but by 1952 a Jamaican men's representative team again played internationally, organising an entire series against a Caribbean All Stars team.
Under the leadership of Jorge Penna Jamaica did participate in a men's FIFA World Cup qualification campaign for the first time in 1965, failing to qualify for the 1966 edition by losing to Mexico and Costa Rica in the final stage.

Football governance
The Jamaica Football Federation (JFF) is the governing body of football in Jamaica. It was formed in 1910 and governs men's football since then and women's football since 1991.
Between 1987 and 1991, women's football was governed by the Jamaican Women’s Football Federation.

The JFF joined CONCACAF and FIFA in 1962.

League system
There is currently no women's league in Jamaica. For the men's league system, see Jamaican football league system

Cup system
There is currently no women's cup tournament in Jamaica. For the men's cup, see JFF Champions Cup

Men's National team

One of the major successes of the Jamaica men's national team came when the team qualified for the 1998 FIFA World Cup in France. They did not progress beyond the first round, but managed to win their final group match against Japan, winning 2-1. They have also won the Caribbean Cup on five occasions.

Women's national team

One of the major successes of the Jamaica women's national team came when the team qualified for the 2019 FIFA Women's World Cup in France. They lost all their group matches, but Havana Solaun managed to score a first ever World Cup goal for the team in their final group match against Australia. They have participate in 7 CONCACAF W Championships, winning the bronze medal in 2018 and 2022. They also finished runners up in the second CFU Women's Caribbean Cup in 2014.

Jamaican football clubs

References

External links
Jamaica Football Federation